Gaurax is a genus of flies in the family Chloropidae.

Species
G. apicalis Malloch,  915
G. atrilinea Sabrosky, 1951
G. atripalpus Sabrosky, 1951
G. basitarsalis Sabrosky, 1951
G. borealis (Duda, 1933)
G. britannicus Deeming, 1980
G. dorsalis (Loew, 1863)
G. dubia (Macquart, 1835)
G. dubius (Macquart, 1835)
G. ephippium (Zetterstedt, 1848)
G. fascipes Becker, 1910
G. festivus Loew,  863
G. flavomaculatus (Duda, 1933)
G. flavoscutellatus (Stackelberg, 1955)
G. fumipennis (Malloch, 1915)
G. gauracicornis (Duda, 1933)
G. leucarista Nartshuk, 1962
G. macrocerus (Nartshuk, 1962)
G. maculicornis Sabrosky, 1951
G. maculipennis (Zetterstedt, 1848)
G. maculipes Sabrosky, 1951
G. melanotum Sabrosky, 1951
G. mesopedalis Sabrosky, 1951
G. montanus Coquillett,  898
G. niger Czerny, 1906
G. obscuripennis Johnson, 1913
G. ocellaris Sabrosky, 1951
G. pallidipes Malloch,  915
G. patelainae Peterson, 1967
G. pilosula (Becker, 1912)
G. polonicus Nartshuk, 1980
G. pseudostigma Johnson, 1913
G. semivittatus Sabrosky, 1951
G. shannoni Sabrosky, 1951
G. splendidus Malloch,  915
G. strobilum Karps, 1983
G. tripus Sabrosky, 1951
G. varihalterata (Malloch, 1913)
G. vittipes Sabrosky, 1951

References

Europe
Nearctic

Oscinellinae
Chloropidae genera
Taxa named by Hermann Loew